Callisto most commonly refers to:
Callisto (mythology), a nymph
Callisto (moon), a moon of Jupiter

Callisto may also refer to:

Art and entertainment 
Callisto series, a sequence of novels by Lin Carter
Callisto, a novel by Torsten Krol
Callisto (comics), a fictional mutant in X-Men
Callisto (Xena), a character on Xena: Warrior Princess
"Callisto" (Xena: Warrior Princess episode)
 Callisto family, a fictional family in the Miles from Tomorrowland TV series
Callisto, a toy in the Mattel Major Matt Mason series
Callisto (band), a band from Turku, Finland

People with the name
 Callisto Cosulich (1922–2015), Italian film critic, author, journalist and screenwriter
 Callisto Pasuwa, Zimbabwean soccer coach
 Callisto Piazza (1500–1561), Italian painter

Other uses 
Callisto (moth), a genus of moths in the family Gracillariidae
CALLISTO, a reusable test rocket
Callisto Corporation, a software development company
Callisto, a release of version 3.2 of Eclipse
Callisto, an AMD Phenom II processor core
Callisto (organization), a non-profit organization

See also
 Calisto (disambiguation)
 Kallisto (disambiguation)
 Callista (disambiguation)
 Callistus (disambiguation)
 Castillo (disambiguation)